George Robert Carruthers (October 1, 1939 – December 26, 2020) was an African American inventor, physicist, engineer and space scientist. Carruthers perfected a compact and very powerful ultraviolet camera/spectrograph for NASA to use when it launched Apollo 16 in 1972. He designed it so astronauts could use it on the lunar surface, making all adjustments inside their bulky space suits. Upon instructions from Carruthers, they used the camera to record the Earth's outermost atmosphere, noting its variations, and also mapped portions of the far-ultraviolet sky recording stars and galaxies, and the gaseous media between them. In 1970, sending his instruments aboard Aerobee sounding rockets, he had demonstrated that molecular hydrogen exists in the interstellar medium. Among numerous citations and awards, in 2003, Carruthers was inducted into the National Inventors Hall of Fame, and he received an honorary doctorate for Engineering from Michigan Technological University.  He also was awarded the 2011 National Medal for Technology and Invention from President Barack Obama, "For invention of the Far UV Electrographic Camera, which significantly improved our understanding of space and earth science."

Life and work
Carruthers, who is African-American, was born October 1, 1939, in Cincinnati, Ohio, to George and Sophia Carruthers. His father was a civil engineer and his mother was a homemaker. His family initially lived in Milford, Ohio. At an early age George, through reading popular space fiction and the early 1950s Colliers' series on space flight, developed an interest in physics, science and astronomy, which his father also encouraged. At the age of 10, he built his first telescope out of cardboard tubing and lenses purchased using money he earned as a delivery boy.

His father died when Carruthers was 12, and at that time his family moved to the South Side of Chicago where they stayed with relatives until George went to college. He did not perform well in elementary school, earning poor grades in math and physics. However, he won three separate science fair awards during this time. Also as a child, he enjoyed visiting Chicago museums, libraries and the Adler Planetarium that supplemented his avid science-fiction reading. After Sputnik he experimented with model rocketry, becoming a member of the junior division of the Chicago Rocket Society and various science clubs.

After graduating from Englewood High School, he entered the College of Engineering at the University of Illinois at Urbana–Champaign, and received a Bachelor of Science degree in physics in 1961. Carruthers did his graduate work at the University of Illinois and earned a Master's degree in nuclear engineering in 1962. Carruthers received a Ph.D. in aeronautical and astronautical engineering in 1964. While conducting his graduate studies, Carruthers worked as researcher and teaching assistant studying plasma and gases. As he completed his thesis, he applied for a postdoctoral appointment at the U.S. Naval Research Laboratory funded by NSF, and spent the next 38 years of his life there.

During the 1980s, Carruthers helped create a program called the Science & Engineers Apprentice Program, which allows high school students to spend a summer working with scientists at the Naval Research Laboratory (NRL). Carruthers also worked with NRL's community outreach organization, and as such helped support several educational activities in the sciences in the Washington D.C. area.  He was involved in many initiatives to encourage involvement of African Americans in science and technology, and to encourage them to become technologically literate, such as Project SMART (formed by Congressman Mervyn [M.] Dymally), the National Society of Black Physicists, and the National Technical Association.  He frequently participated in public observing events at Howard University and SMART Day programs at the National Air and Space Museum.

Since 1983 he was Chairman of the Editing and Review Committee and Editor, Journal of the National Technical Association.  This journal included biographical sketches and career profiles of prominent African American scientists and engineers, and was distributed to high schools and to colleges.

During the summers of 1996 and 1997 he taught a course in Earth and Space Science for D.C. Public Schools Science teachers. He also helped develop a series of videotapes on Earth and Space science for high-school students.

Since 2002, retiring from NRL, Carruthers taught a two-semester course in Earth and Space Science at Howard University sponsored by a NASA Aerospace Workforce Development Grant.

On February 12, 2009, Carruthers was honored as a Distinguished Lecturer at the Office of Naval Research for his achievements in the field of space science.

On February 1, 2013, Dr. Carruthers was awarded the 2012 National Medal of Technology and Innovation by President Barack Obama at the White House.

He was a member of the American Astronomical Society, the American Geophysical Union, the American Institute of Aeronautics and Astronautics, the American Association for the Advancement of Science and the National Society of Black Physicists.

He lived most of his life in Washington, DC.

Carruthers died of congestive heart failure on December 26, 2020, in Washington D.C.

Inventions and discoveries
Carruthers is considered the inventor of the first far-ultraviolet electrographic detector design that was robust enough to operate in space as the heart of an ultraviolet camera/spectrograph. His early work with this design detected an upper limit to the amount of molecular hydrogen that exists in the interstellar medium, answering numerous questions astronomers were asking at that time about what was then referred to as the "missing mass" problem.

In 1964, Carruthers began employment for the U.S. Naval Research Laboratory in Washington, D.C., where his work focused on far ultraviolet astronomy. 1969 was the year he received a patent for his invention, the "Image Converter," which detected electromagnetic radiation in short wavelengths, and in 1970, he made the first examination of molecular hydrogen in space.

Two years later, Carruthers developed the first moon-based observatory, the Far Ultraviolet Camera/Spectrograph, which was used in the Apollo 16 mission. In 1986, one of Carruthers' inventions captured an ultraviolet image of Halley's Comet. Among other projects, in 1991, he developed a camera that was used in a Space Shuttle Mission.

Awards
Arthur S. Flemming Award (Washington Jaycees), 1970
Exceptional Achievement Scientific Award Medal NASA 1972
Black Engineer of the Year Award 1987 
Warner Prize of the American Astronomical Society
National Science Foundation Fellow
Honorary Doctor of Engineering, Michigan Technological University
Inducted into the National Inventors' Hall of Fame, 2003
National Medal of Technology and Innovation, 2011

References

External links
George Carruthers, About
Notables, George Carruthers
 Biography of Carruthers from IEEE
 Video clip highlighting Dr. George Carruthers' distinguished career as a space scientist
 Video of Carruthers talking about his work, from the National Science & Technology Medals Foundation
Oral history interview transcript with George Carruthers on 18 August 1992, American Institute of Physics, Niels Bohr Library & Archives

1939 births
2020 deaths
Engineers from Illinois
20th-century American inventors
Grainger College of Engineering alumni
Scientists from Chicago
Scientists from Cincinnati
African-American engineers
African-American inventors
21st-century American physicists
People from Milford, Ohio
Engineers from Ohio
Members of the National Society of Black Physicists
Englewood Technical Prep Academy alumni
21st-century African-American scientists
20th-century African-American people